"What's He Doing in My World" is a 1965 single by Eddy Arnold.  The single was Arnold's twentieth number one on the U.S. country chart, and his first number one in ten years.  "What's He Doing in My World" stayed at number one for two weeks and spent a total of twenty-four weeks on the chart.

Chart performance

References

1965 singles
Eddy Arnold songs
Songs written by Carl Belew
Billboard Hot Country Songs number-one singles of the year
Song recordings produced by Chet Atkins
1965 songs
RCA Records singles